First Baptist Church East 8th Street, historically named Shiloh Baptist Church, is a historic church at 506 E. 8th Street in Chattanooga, Tennessee.

The congregation was organized in 1866 as Shiloh Baptist Church by a group of men who had served as soldiers in the Union Army during the Civil War. Initially they worshiped in a blacksmith shop; subsequently they met for worship in members' homes.

The church building was built in 1885 with the labor of former slaves. It was added to the National Register of Historic Places in 1979.

References

External links
 

Baptist churches in Tennessee
Churches on the National Register of Historic Places in Tennessee
Gothic Revival church buildings in Tennessee
Churches completed in 1885
19th-century Baptist churches in the United States
Churches in Chattanooga, Tennessee
National Register of Historic Places in Chattanooga, Tennessee